Nicolás "Nico" Brussino (born 2 March 1993) is an Argentine professional basketball player for Herbalife Gran Canaria of the Spanish Liga ACB. He also represents the senior Argentine national basketball team.

Professional career

Regatas Corrientes (2012–2015)
After two years playing for San Martín de Marcos Juárez, Brussino joined Regatas Corrientes on July 22, 2012. Before the 2012–13 season, it was discovered that Brussino had a heart problem. This congenital disease saw an abnormal electrical connection between the atria and ventricles. Despite this, he still managed 29 games for Corrientes, averaging 1.9 points and 1.1 rebounds per game, while helping Corrientes win the 2012–13 LNB championship.

In 2013–14, Brussino averaged 6.0 points and 2.6 rebounds in 55 games, and in 2014–15, he again played in 55 games and averaged 9.4 points, 3.2 rebounds, and 1.3 assists per game.

Peñarol (2015–2016)
On August 1, 2015, Brussino signed with Peñarol. In 2015–16, he averaged 14.6 points, 5.5 rebounds, 3.1 assists and 1.5 steals in 59 games.

Dallas Mavericks (2016–2017)
On July 15, 2016, Brussino signed with the Dallas Mavericks. He made his NBA debut in the Mavericks' season opener on October 26, 2016, recording one assist in 34 seconds of game time in a 130–121 overtime loss to the Indiana Pacers. On March 15, 2017, he scored eight of his season-high 11 points in the fourth quarter of the Mavericks' 112–107 win over the Washington Wizards. He also had nine rebounds in the game while playing 23 minutes off the bench. On April 4, 2017, he had a season-high 13 points along with seven rebounds and five assists in a 98–87 loss to the Sacramento Kings. During his rookie season, he had multiple assignments with the Texas Legends of the NBA Development League. On July 20, 2017, he was waived by the Mavericks.

Atlanta Hawks (2017)
On July 22, 2017, Brussino was claimed off waivers by the Atlanta Hawks. On December 8, 2017, he was waived by the Hawks after appearing in four games. He also appeared in eight contests with the Erie BayHawks, Atlanta's NBA G League affiliate.

Herbalife Gran Canaria (2018)
On 31 December 2017, Brussino signed with Spanish club Herbalife Gran Canaria for the rest of the 2017–18 season.

Iberostar Tenerife (2018–2019)
On July 26, 2018, Brussino signed a one–plus–one deal with Iberostar Tenerife of the Liga ACB.

Basket Zaragoza (2019–2021)
On July 5, 2019, Brussino signed a two-year deal with Basket Zaragoza of the Liga ACB. He averaged 9.8 points and 4 rebounds during the 2019-20 season. On June 12, 2020, Brussino re-signed with the team.

Return to Herbalife Gran Canaria (2021–present)
On July 1, 2021, he has signed with Herbalife Gran Canaria of the Spanish Liga ACB.

National team career
Brussino is a senior Argentine national basketball team member. He won a silver medal with Argentina's senior national team at the 2015 FIBA Americas Championship. He also played at the 2016 Summer Olympics, and at the 2017 FIBA AmeriCup, where he won a silver medal and was named to the All-Tournament Team.

In 2019, he participated in the team that won the Pan American gold medal in Lima. He was included in the Argentine squad for the 2019 FIBA Basketball World Cup and clinched the silver medal with Argentina, which emerged as runners-up to Spain at the 2019 FIBA Basketball World Cup.

In 2022, Brussino won the gold medal in the 2022 FIBA AmeriCup held in Recife, Brazil. He was one of Argentina´s small forwards in the tournament.

NBA career statistics

Regular season

|-
| align="left" | 
| align="left" | Dallas
| 54 || 2 || 9.6 || .369 || .305 || .773 || 1.7 || .9 || .3 || .1 || 2.8
|-
| align="left" | 
| align="left" | Atlanta
| 4 || 0 || 2.5 || .000 || .000 || .000 || 0.8 || .0 || .0 || .0 || .0
|- class="sortbottom"
| style="text-align:center;" colspan="2"|  Career
| 58 || 2 || 9.2 || .364 || .299 || .773 || 1.7 || .8 || .3 || .1 || 2.6

Personal life
Brussino, who has Italian ancestry (the surname was originally Bruscino), received Italian citizenship. Brussino's brother, Juan, also plays basketball in Argentina.

References

External links
Nicolás Brussino at acb.com 

Nicolás Brussino at eurocupbasketball.com
Nicolás Brussino at basquetplus.com 

1993 births
Living people
2019 FIBA Basketball World Cup players
Argentine expatriate basketball people in Spain
Argentine expatriate basketball people in the United States
Argentine men's basketball players
Argentine people of Italian descent
Atlanta Hawks players
Basketball players at the 2016 Summer Olympics
Basketball players at the 2019 Pan American Games
Basketball players at the 2020 Summer Olympics
Basket Zaragoza players
CB Canarias players
CB Gran Canaria players
Dallas Mavericks players
Erie BayHawks (2017–2019) players
Italian expatriate basketball people in Spain
Italian expatriate basketball people in the United States
Italian men's basketball players
Liga ACB players
National Basketball Association players from Argentina
Olympic basketball players of Argentina
Pan American Games medalists in basketball
Peñarol de Mar del Plata basketball players
People from Iriondo Department
Regatas Corrientes basketball players
Shooting guards
Small forwards
Sportspeople from Santa Fe Province
Texas Legends players
Undrafted National Basketball Association players
Pan American Games gold medalists for Argentina
Medalists at the 2019 Pan American Games